Eucalyptus hypolaena is a species of tree or mallee that is endemic to Western Australia. It has hard, dark grey bark near the base of the trunk, smooth bark above, lance-shaped adult leaves, flower buds arranged in groups of seven, pale yellow flowers and shortened spherical to barrel-shaped fruit.

Description
It has rough, dark grey, fibrous, scaly and flaky bark on the lowest  of the trunk, smooth white to grey or pale pink bark above. Flowering occurs between May and September and the flowers are pale yellow.

Taxonomy and naming
Eucalyptus hypolaena was first formally described in 1999 by Lawrie Johnson and Ken Hill in the journal Telopea. The specific epithet is from the ancient Greek hypo meaning "under" and (ch)laina meaning " a cloak", referring to the hard bark at the base of the trunk.

Distribution and habitat
This mallee grows in mallee woodland in red, sandy loam with other eucalypts, including E. yilgarnensis and E. celastroides. It is found to the east and north of Kalgoorlie and into the Great Victoria Desert in the Coolgardie, Great Victoria Desert and Murchison biogeographical regions.

Conservation status
Eucalyptus hypolaena is classified as "not threatened" by the Western Australian Government Department of Parks and Wildlife,

See also

List of Eucalyptus species

References

Eucalypts of Western Australia
dolichocera
Myrtales of Australia
Plants described in 1999
Taxa named by Lawrence Alexander Sidney Johnson
Taxa named by Ken Hill (botanist)